Bearsbridge is a village in Northumberland, in England. It is situated to the west of Hexham, on the A686.

Governance 
Bearsbridge is in the parliamentary constituency of Hexham.

References

Villages in Northumberland